Whistling Down the Wire is the third album by Crosby & Nash, released on ABC Records in 1976, the second of the duo's three-album deal with ABC Records. Cassette and 8-track tape versions of the album were distributed by Atlantic Records, to which Crosby, Stills, Nash & Young were signed. It peaked at No. 26 on the Billboard 200 album chart and was certified gold by the RIAA. Two singles were released from the album, "Out of the Darkness" and "Spotlight," of which only the first charted on the Billboard Hot 100, peaking at #89.

Background
After the success of their previous album, David Crosby and Graham Nash took the band that played on the album out on tour in the summer and fall of 1975. In the course of recording sessions for this album, both were invited to add vocals to a project by Stephen Stills and Neil Young that would become that pair's only duo album to date, Long May You Run credited to the Stills-Young Band. What could have been a potential CSNY reunion got torpedoed after Nash and Crosby left Miami to finish the sessions for what would become Whistling Down the Wire, and Young and Stills reacted by removing the duo's vocals and other contributions from the master tapes. Crosby and Nash vowed never to work with either again. They toured again to support this album in 1976, but by the end of the year reunited with Stills for the second CSN trio album, released in 1977. That album would successfully reactivate the trio on a more or less permanent basis, and there would not be a new Crosby & Nash studio album for another 28 years.

Content
As on their previous two albums, the instrumental backing was provided by the group of session musicians known as The Section, here consisting of keyboardist Craig Doerge, guitarist Danny Kortchmar, and drummer Russell Kunkel, along with multi-instrumentalist David Lindley and bassist Tim Drummond and known as 'The Mighty Jitters' when on tour with the duo. Many tracks for this album, including "Time After Time," "J.B.'s Blues," and "Marguerita" were left over from the sessions for Wind on the Water. The song Mutiny is a reference to the Mutiny Hotel in Miami, a noted hotspot in the 1970s.

Both this album and its predecessor exemplify the sub-genre of soft rock prevalent in much of mid-1970s popular music. With two gold albums in a row, the duo's success on records had outstripped that of their former partner Stills, whose only gold album certification among his most recent five albums had been the one in tandem with Young. Yet, when the opportunity arose, the pair agreed to join up with Stills and continue as Crosby, Stills, and Nash.

Sessions took place at Rudy Recorders in San Francisco, and the Sound Lab in Los Angeles. Whistling Down the Wire was reissued for compact disc on January 11, 2000, on MCA Records. It was made available again as part of MCA's new manufacture on-demand process.

Track listing

Side one

Side two

Personnel 
 David Crosby – vocals, acoustic guitar
 Graham Nash – vocals, acoustic guitar, electric guitar, harmonica

Additional personnel
 Craig Doerge – acoustic piano, electric piano, organ, glass harmonica
 David Lindley – electric guitar, slide guitar, pedal steel guitar, viola, violin 
 Danny Kortchmar – electric guitar, dobro
 Laura Allan – zither
 Tim Drummond – bass
 Russ Kunkel – drums, percussion
 Lee Holdridge – string arrangements (4, 10)
 Sid Sharp – orchestra leader (4, 10)

Production personnel
 Crosby & Nash – producers
 Stephen Barncard and Don Gooch – engineers
 Lanky Linstrot – mastering at ABC Recording Studios (Los Angeles, California)
 Gary Burden and Jenice Heo – art direction
 Joel Bernstein – photography
 Stephen Barncard and Mike Ragonga – reissue producers
 Erick Labson – remastering engineer

Chart

Certification

Tour

External links
 Crosby & Nash

References

1976 albums
ABC Records albums
Albums arranged by Lee Holdridge
Albums produced by David Crosby
Albums produced by Graham Nash
Albums produced by Stephen Barncard
Crosby & Nash albums